Ferdinand Oswald (born 5 October 1990) is a German professional footballer who plays as a goalkeeper for WSG Tirol.

Career
Oswald joined Bayern Munich in 2004, and was promoted to the reserve team five years later. He made his debut in a 3. Liga match against Werder Bremen II in November 2009. His third appearance for the team was as an outfield player – for the second game of the 2010–11 season, Bayern II had a player shortage, and Oswald was one of only two players on the substitutes bench. The other sub, Thomas Kurz had already come on when striker Saër Sène suffered an injury, so Oswald came on and played the remainder of the game in midfield. The match, against Wacker Burghausen, ended in a 1–1 draw. He was released by Bayern at the end of the 2010–11 season and signed for Austrian side WSG Wattens. A year later he returned to Germany to sign for FC Schalke 04 II. Oswald returned to WSG Wattens in 2014.

References

External links

1990 births
Living people
German footballers
Association football goalkeepers
Germany youth international footballers
3. Liga players
Regionalliga players
Austrian Football Bundesliga players
2. Liga (Austria) players
Austrian Regionalliga players
FC Bayern Munich II players
FC Schalke 04 II players
WSG Tirol players
German expatriate footballers
German expatriate sportspeople in Austria
Expatriate footballers in Austria
People from Weilheim-Schongau
Sportspeople from Upper Bavaria
Footballers from Bavaria